Orthetrum trinacria, the Long Skimmer, is a species of dragonfly in the family Libellulidae. It is found in Algeria, Angola, Botswana, Burkina Faso, Cameroon, Ivory Coast, Egypt, Ethiopia, France (Corsica), Gambia, Ghana, Italy (Sicily and Sardinia), Kenya, Libya, Madagascar, Malawi, Mali, Morocco, Mozambique, Namibia, Niger, Nigeria, Senegal, Somalia, South Africa, Tanzania, Togo, Uganda, Zambia, Zimbabwe, and possibly Burundi. It was recently recorded in the Maltese Islands in 2003 and was recorded breeding on the island of Gozo in 2004. Its natural habitats are rivers, shrub-dominated wetlands, swamps, freshwater lakes, intermittent freshwater lakes, freshwater marshes, and intermittent freshwater marshes. Also breeding in Southern Spain (Murcia and Malaga Provinces) and the Canary Islands.

References

Sciberras, A.; Sciberras, J. and Magro D. (2007)  "A Celebration of Dragonflies". The Malta Independent. November 19, pp. 8–9.
Sciberras, A.  (2008) A Contribution To The Knowledge Of Odonata In The Maltese Islands. The Central Mediterranean Naturalist 4(4): pp. 275–288.
Orthetrum trinacria : 2012 : a new species on the island of Corsica 

Libellulidae
Taxonomy articles created by Polbot
Insects described in 1841